Georg Heinrich Wilhelm Schimper in Amharic sources known as Sambar (2 August 1804 – October 1878) was a renowned German botanist and naturalist, who spent more than forty years in Ethiopia collecting specimens of plants, mainly in Semien, the Tekeze area and around Adwa. Schimper discovered more new African plant species than possibly any other botanist, and numerous plant species bear the epithet Schimperi/Schimperiana.

Biography 
Schimper  was born at Lauf an der Pegnitz in Bavaria. He was the son of Margaretha Baroness von Furthenbach and the engineer and teacher Friedrich Ludwig Heinrich Schimper.   He was a brother to naturalist Karl Friedrich Schimper (1803–1867).

From 1828 to 1830 Schimper studied natural history in Munich and entered into contact with Eduard Rüppell, and for a short period of time worked with geologist Louis Agassiz as a draftsman and illustrator. In 1831 he undertook a botanical collection trip to Algiers, about which, he published Reise nach Algier in den jahren 1831 und 1832. A few years later he conducted botanical research in Egypt and the Sinai, eventually settling in Ethiopia in 1836.

During his time spent in Ethiopia, he had residences in Tigray and Semien provinces. For a period of time he was governor of Enticho, a district in Tigray, under the rule of Dejazmach Wube Haile Maryam, who had him marry Mirritsit, a woman from a prominent family in Adwa, who bore him several children. Although he was imprisoned at Magdala by Emperor Tewodros II, otherwise he suffered no serious losses during that unsettled time. While in Ethiopia, he maintained correspondence with botanists in Europe, and made valuable contributions to natural history collections in Paris and Berlin. He was also  a collector for Unio Itineraria (Der Esslinger Botanische Reiseverein) in Württemberg. 

During the years 1864 to 1868 he wrote an extensive report on his observations made in the course of his botanical trips through Tigray in northern Ethiopia. The manuscripts came to the British Museum in 1870 and are now kept in the British Library. They are available online in the public domain.

Schimper died at Adwa in Tigray, Ethiopia .

Taxa 
His name is commemorated by the botanical genera Schimpera (family Brassicaceae), Schimperella (now a synonym of Oreoschimperella ) and Schimperina (now a synonym of Agelanthus ). 

The species epithet schimperiana is attached to a number of plants; a few examples being Habenaria schimperiana, Pyrrosia schimperiana (now a synonym of Hovenkampia schimperiana,), Festuca schimperiana and Kalanchoe schimperiana.

References

Notes

 "This article incorporates translated text from an equivalent article at the German Wikipedia".

Relevant literature

McEwan, Dorothea. "Georg Wilhelm Schimper (1804-1878). Maps and cross-sectional profiles of Tigray, the Semen Mountains and the Märäb and Täkkäze regions of Ethiopa".  Journal of the International Map Collectors’ Society ( IMCoS), London, June 2020 edition, 7-17. ISSN 0956-5728.

External links
 CRC World Dictionary of Plant Names: R-Z by Umberto Quattrocchi
 Georg Wilhelm Schimper - in Abyssinia. Observations on Tigre – Online Edition at German Historical Institute London

1804 births
1878 deaths
People from Nürnberger Land
People from the Kingdom of Bavaria
Ludwig Maximilian University of Munich alumni
19th-century German botanists